These are the official results of the athletics competition at the 2022 Mediterranean Games which took place between 30 June and 3 July 2022 in Oran, Algeria.

Men's results

100 metres

Heats – 30 JuneWind:Heat 1: +0.6 m/s, Heat 2: +0.4 m/s

Final – 30 JuneWind: +0.9 m/s

200 metres

Heats – 2 JulyWind:Heat 1: +0.9 m/s, Heat 2: +0.9 m/s

Final – 3 JulyWind: +0.8 m/s

400 metres

Heats – 1 July

Final – 2 July

800 metres

Heats – 1 July

Final – 3 July

1500 metres
2 July

5000 metres
3 July

Half marathon
1 July

110 metres hurdles

Heats – 2 JulyWind:Heat 1: +0.7 m/s, Heat 2: -0.4 m/s

Final – 3 JulyWind: +0.3 m/s

400 metres hurdles

Heats – 30 June

Final – 1 July

3000 metres steeplechase
30 June

4 × 100 metres relay
1 July

4 × 400 metres relay
3 July

High jump
1 July

Pole vault
2 July

Long jump
3 July

Triple jump
30 June

Shot put
30 June

Discus throw
3 July

Hammer throw
1 July

Javelin throw
2 July

Women's results

100 metres

Heats – 30 JuneWind:Heat 1: +0.7 m/s, Heat 2: +0.6 m/s

Final – 30 JuneWind: +0.5 m/s

200 metres

Heats – 2 JulyWind:Heat 1: +0.6 m/s, Heat 2: +0.8 m/s

Final – 3 JulyWind: +0.9 m/s

400 metres
2 July

800 metres

Heats – 30 June

Final – 2 July

1500 metres
3 July

5000 metres
2 July

Half marathon
1 July

100 metres hurdles

Heats – 2 JulyWind:Heat 1: +0.5 m/s, Heat 2: +1.0 m/s

Final – 3 JulyWind: +1.0 m/s

400 metres hurdles

Heats – 30 June

Final – 1 July

3000 metres steeplechase
1 July

4 × 100 metres relay
1 July

4 × 400 metres relay
3 July

High jump
3 July

Long jump
1 July

Triple jump
2 July

Discus throw
30 June

Hammer throw
30 June

Javelin throw
2 July

References

Mediterranean Games
2022 Results
Sports at the 2022 Mediterranean Games